Kaki is a 2015 Indian romantic-horror film directed by Manon and starring  Ashok, Meghashree, Sangeetha Bhat, and Kiran Pattikonda. The film was simultaneously shot in Telugu and Tamil as Ka Ka Ka: Aabathin Arikuri, which released in 2017.

Plot 
In the United States, Karthik (Ashok) marries Deepthi (Meghashree). They both come to India to assist Kiran (Kiran Pattikonda) in his factory and decide to stay in his village.

As Karthik is busy with his work, he goes to the city and leaves Deepti in the bungalow with Ammu (Baby Yuvina) and the watchman (Ramesh Pandit). One day, Natchatiram (Yogi Babu) enters the house and introduces himself as the cook. Evil forces start to take over Ammu and Natchatiram notices this while talking to her. The evil forces prevents Kathik and Deepti from uniting. The evil force also includes a ghost (Sangeetha Bhat). After the force creates havoc in the house, a doctor (Nassar), who is Deepthi's father. Who is this ghost? What do these evil forces have to do with Karthik and Deepti? These questions form the rest of the story.

Cast 

 Ashok as Karthik
 Meghashree as Deepti
 Sangeetha Bhat as Ghost
 Kiran Pattikonda as Kiran
 Nassar as Deepthi's father
 Jayasudha as Mother Clara
 Yogi Babu as Chitram (Telugu) / Natchatiram (Tamil)
 Ramesh Pandit as Watchman
 Baby Yuvina as Ammu
 Ronald Raj S. Williams as Inspector
 Chandu as Psycho

Production 
The film was shot in Tamil and Telugu languages simultaneously and is directed by Manon, who worked as an assistant to directors P. Vasu, Vetrimaaran and Raghavan, in his directorial debut. Kiran Pattikonda, who debuts as a producer, also plays a role in the film. The film was shot in Chennai, Hyderabad, Visakhapatnam, and Puducherry. Ashok and  Meghashree  were to portray a couple in the film with the latter making her Tamil film debut. The makers initially roped in Shruti Ramakrishnan to portray the second heroine and is seen during the flashback portions before she was replaced by Kannada actress Sangeetha Bhat. Saravana Natrajan, an assistant to Velraj, worked as the cinematographer for the film while Amruth was brought in to compose the music. Nassar, Jayasudha and Yogi Babu play supporting roles in the film.

Release 
 Telugu version 
123 Telugu gave the film a rating of two-and-three-quarters out of five and wrote that "Even though there is nothing much new in terms of story and performances, they way it has been narrated with some enjoyable elements makes it a passable watch for all the horror film lovers this weekend".

 Tamil version 
Maalai Malar gave the film a rating of eighty out of a hundred and stated how "Overall there is a lack of suspense of in Ka Ka Ka: Aabathin Arikuri".

References

External links 

2010s Telugu-language films
2010s Tamil-language films
2015 films
Indian multilingual films
2015 multilingual films
2015 romance films
2015 horror films
2015 directorial debut films